Penny Gold is a 1973 British drama film directed by Jack Cardiff and starring James Booth, Francesca Annis, Nicky Henson and Joss Ackland. The screenplay concerns two policemen who investigate a series of murders.

Premise
A police detective investigates the murder of a young woman, and discovers that the crime is connected to her surviving twin sister and an extremely valuable stamp.

Cast
 James Booth - Matthews
 Francesca Annis - Delphi/Diane
 Nicky Henson - Rogers
 Joss Ackland - Jones
 Richard Heffer - Claude
 Sue Lloyd - Model
 Joseph O'Conor - Blachford
 Una Stubbs - Anna
 George Murcell - Doctor Merrick
 Marianne Stone - Mrs Parsons
 Penelope Keith - Miss Hartridge
 John Savident - Sir Robert Hampton
 Clinton Greyn - Van Der Meij
 Christian Rodska - Clerk
 Marc Zuber - Hotel Receptionist
 Anthony Naylor - Rugby Player
 John Rhys-Davies - Rugby Player
 Rodney Cardiff - Doctor
 Stephanie Smith - Delphi/Diane as a child
 Peter Salmon - Male model
 Michael Buchanan - Male model

Critical reception
Time Out noted, "a brilliant opening sequence, otherwise this flat-footed British thriller is hampered by something like the world's worst script, including flashbacks no one would ever conceivably flash back to, and by a cumbersome storyline about big league stamp trading"; while Sky Movies wrote, "the spirit of the British crime movie of the Fifties lives on in this old-fashioned thriller about the hunt for a rare stamp - the Penny Gold of the title. Jack Cardiff directs with obvious affection for a genre long past but it's hard on such distinguished players as Francesca Annis and James Booth not to have more meat on which to bite."

References

External links

1973 films
1970s English-language films
Films directed by Jack Cardiff
Films scored by John Scott (composer)
1973 drama films
Films shot at Pinewood Studios
British drama films
1970s British films